The Anvil Point Lighthouse is a fully-automated lighthouse located at Durlston Country Park near Swanage in Dorset, England. It is owned by Trinity House and currently operated as two holiday cottages.

The lighthouse, residential block and associated buildings are listed Grade II as part of a single entry on the National Heritage List for England.

History

The lighthouse is built of local stone and was completed in 1881. It was opened by Joseph Chamberlain, the President of the Board of Trade. The light is positioned to give a waypoint for vessels passing along the English Channel coast.

The lamp was also specially designed for Anvil Point by James Douglass; it was subsequently used in other large coastal lighthouses, a series of international patents having been granted.

An explosive fog signal was established at the lighthouse in February 1894, which in foggy weather sounded once every ten minutes (later altered to every five minutes).

In the early 20th century a paraffin vapour burner (PVB) replaced the oil lamp.

During 1960, the lighthouse was modernised and electrified (with a new lamp, powered by mains electricity, replacing the PVB). At the same time a smaller optic replaced the original lens array, which was removed and donated to the Science Museum. That same year, the five-minute explosive fog signal was replaced by a triple-frequency electric signal, sounded from a stack of thirty tannoy emitters positioned on the seaward edge of the compound directly in front of the lighthouse. In 1981 new automatic equipment was installed, but the fog signal was discontinued in 1988.

Anvil Point Lighthouse was fully automated on 31 May 1991 and is now monitored and controlled from the Trinity House Operations Control Centre at Harwich.

The lighthouse had a 1,000 watt filament lamp with an intensity of 500,000 Candela.

In 2012, an LED lamp was installed above the rotating Fresnel lens to serve as the main light at Anvil Point; its character is, as it was previously, a white flash every 10 seconds. (The old lens, though no longer in use, remains in place in the tower.)

See also

List of lighthouses in England

References

External links

 Trinity House
 Photograph of the original first-order optic
 Photograph of the Paraffin Vapour Burner
 1993 video tour of the lighthouse by P. Halil (former keeper)

1881 establishments in England
Lighthouses completed in 1881
Lighthouse museums in England
Lighthouses in Dorset
Lighthouses of the English Channel
Tourist attractions in Dorset
Towers in Dorset